
Gmina Przytuły is a rural gmina (administrative district) in Łomża County, Podlaskie Voivodeship, in north-eastern Poland.

Villages
Gmina Przytuły contains the villages and settlements of Bagienice, Borawskie, Chrzanowo, Doliwy, Gardoty, Grzymki, Kubra-Przebudówka, Mieczki, Mroczki, Nowa Kubra, Obrytki, Pieńki Okopne, Przytuły, Przytuły-Kolonia, Przytuły-Las, Stara Kubra, Supy, Trzaski, Wagi and Wilamowo.

Neighbouring gminas
Gmina Przytuły is bordered by the gminas of Grabowo, Jedwabne, Radziłów, Stawiski and Wąsosz.

References

Polish official population figures 2006

Przytuly
Łomża County